The first series of Merlin, a British fantasy television series, began on 20 September 2008 and ended on 13 December 2008. Regular cast members for the first series include Colin Morgan, Bradley James, Katie McGrath, Angel Coulby, Anthony Head, Richard Wilson, and John Hurt as the voice of the Great Dragon. The first series contained thirteen episodes, with 7.15 million tuning into the premier and 6.27 for the series finale. It was the only series to be comprised completely of stand-alone episodes. Before the series finale, the BBC confirmed that the series was renewed for a further 13 episode second series. Series 2 premiered on 19 September 2009.

Plot 
Merlin and Arthur must work together to protect the great kingdom of Camelot against dark sorcery. But Merlin faces a tough challenge in hiding his dark secret from his best friends. Because the only way to fight magic... is with magic.

Cast

Main cast 
 Colin Morgan as Merlin
 Angel Coulby as Gwen
 Bradley James as Arthur
 Katie McGrath as Morgana
 Anthony Head as Uther Pendragon
 Richard Wilson as Gaius

Recurring 
 John Hurt as the Great Dragon (voice)
 Michelle Ryan as Nimueh
 Michael Cronin as Geoffrey of Monmouth
David Durham as Tom
Caroline Faber as Hunith

Guest stars 
 Eve Myles as Lady Helen/Mary Collins
 Will Mellor as Valiant
 Julian Rhind-Tutt as Edwin
 Clive Russell as Bayard
 Santiago Cabrera as Lancelot
 Kenneth Cranham as Aulfric
 Holliday Grainger as Sophia
 Asa Butterfield as Mordred
 Alexander Siddig as Kanen 
 Joe Dempsie as Will
 Frank Finlay as Anhora
 Cal MacAninch as Tauren
 Ed Coleman as Morris

Episodes

References

Merlin (2008 TV series)
2008 British television seasons